This uniform polyhedron compound is a symmetric arrangement of 8 triangular prisms, aligned in pairs with the axes of three-fold rotational symmetry of an octahedron. It results from composing the two enantiomorphs of the compound of 4 triangular prisms.

References 

.

Polyhedral compounds